The Canadian Horse of the Year is a thoroughbred horse racing honour given annually since 1951 by the Jockey Club of Canada. It is the most prestigious honour in Canadian thoroughbred horse racing.

Part of the Sovereign Awards program since 1975, it is similar to the Eclipse Award for American Horse of the Year honours given in the United States.

The original eligibility rules stipulated that the winner be a Canadian-bred horse that did its "best running" in Canada. In 1964, the rule was altered for Northern Dancer, who was a Canadian-bred but whose most notable wins came in the United States when he won the Kentucky Derby and Preakness Stakes. Eventually the requirement that the horse be a Canadian-bred was also dropped. The current rules simply require that the horse have raced at least three times in Canada during the given year (two times for two-year-olds).

Records
Most wins:
 2 - L'Enjoleur (1974, 1975)
 2 - Overskate (1978, 1979)
 2 - Chief Bearhart (1997, 1998)

Most wins by a trainer:
 6 - Gordon J. McCann (1951, 1952, 1954, 1958, 1963, 1968)

Most wins by an owner:
 8 - Sam-Son Farm (1984, 1985, 1986, 1991, 1997, 1998, 2000, 2004)

Honourees

References

 Sovereign Awards at The Jockey Club of Canada

Horse racing awards
Horse racing in Canada